During the 2003–04 Dutch football season, AFC Ajax competed in the Eredivisie.

Season summary
Ajax reclaimed the Eredivisie title.

Players

First-team squad
Squad at end of season

Left club during season

Reserve squad

Transfers

In
  Zdeněk Grygera -  Sparta Prague, 22 July, €3,500,000
  Wesley Sonck -  Genk
  Sander Boschker -  Twente
  Julien Escudé -  Rennes
  Nicolae Mitea -  Dinamo București
  Tom Soetaers -  Roda JC
  Yannis Anastasiou -  Roda JC

Out
  Mido -  Marseille, 12 July, €12,000,000
  Nikos Machlas - contract terminated, July
  Cristian Chivu -  Roma, September, €18,000,000
  Andy van der Meyde -  Inter Milan, £4,000,000
  Mitchell Piqué -  FC Oss
  Richard Witschge -  ADO' 20
  Joey Didulica -  Austria Wien
  André Bergdølmo -  Borussia Dortmund

Loan out
  Cedric van der Gun -  ADO Den Haag, 4 September, end of season
  Nourdin Boukhari -  NAC Breda, 4 September, end of season
  Stefano Seedorf -  NAC Breda, end of season
  Petri Pasanen -  Portsmouth, end of season
  Wamberto -  Mons, 18 months

Results

UEFA Champions League

Third qualifying round

Group stage

References

Notes

AFC Ajax seasons
AFC Ajax
Dutch football championship-winning seasons